Noteboom, Notenboom and Nooteboom are Dutch surnames originally meaning "nut tree". Notable people with those names include:

Noteboom
Daniël Noteboom (1910–1932), Dutch chess player
Erin Noteboom (born 1972), American-born Canadian author with the pen name "Eric Bow"
Joshua Noteboom, a.k.a. Josh One, American DJ
Joseph Noteboom (born 1995), American football player
Stephen Noteboom (born 1969), Dutch tennis player
Notenboom
Bernice Notenboom (born 1962), Dutch climate journalist and adventurer
Francis Notenboom (born 1957), Belgian archer
Harrij Notenboom (born 1926), Dutch politician
Nooteboom
  (born 1928), Dutch Secretary of Finance 1977–80
 Cees Nooteboom (born 1933), Dutch novelist, poet, and journalist 
  (1930–2012), Dutch chemist and politician
 Hans Peter Nooteboom (born 1934), Dutch botanist

See also
, Dutch oversize load trailer company founded in 1881 by Willem Nooteboom
 Nottebohm, German surname of the same origin

Dutch-language surnames